RESS written as an abbreviation may refer to:
 Rechargeable energy storage system, a power storage system
 Responsive Design + Server Side Components, a software architecture for Responsive web design that  use components on the server not just on the client
 Rapid Expansion of Supercritical Solutions, a method used for micronization of substances